Christopher James Lambert (born 14 September 1973 in Henley-on-Thames) is an English former professional association footballer, most famous for playing for Reading.

External links

Jamie Lambert profile at sloughtownfc.net
Jamie Lambert profile at basingstokefc.co.uk

1973 births
People from Henley-on-Thames
Living people
Association football midfielders
English footballers
Reading F.C. players
Walsall F.C. players
Oxford United F.C. players
Slough Town F.C. players
Basingstoke Town F.C. players
English Football League players